The 2011 ICC World Cricket League Americas Region Twenty20 Division Three is a cricket tournament that took place between 14–18 March 2011. Costa Rica hosted the event.

Teams
Teams that qualified are as follows:

Fixtures

Points Table

Matches

Statistics

Most runs
The top five highest run scorers (total runs) are included in this table.

Most wickets
The following table contains the five leading wicket-takers.

See also

2012 ICC World Twenty20 Qualifier

References

2012 ICC World Twenty20